The Scrameustache is a fictional character in a science-fiction Franco-Belgian comics series of the same name. He was created by the Belgian artist Gos. Gos has written and drawn all the Scrameustache's adventures since 1972. Since the mid-1980s he has been assisted by his son Walt. Another son, Benoit has contributed as colourist. It is a popular, ongoing series.

Background

Premise
The adventures of the Scrameustache first started in issue 1806 of Spirou magazine in November 1972 under the title Khéna et le Scrameustache (Khena and the Scrameustache). The story tells of how Khena, a young Peruvian boy living in Europe, meets a cat-like alien who has come to Earth in his own flying saucer. Khena lives with his adoptive father Uncle Georges in the small town of Chambon-Les-Roses and the Scrameustache moves in with them.

What made it a little different from most Earth-kid-meets-alien stories was that a certain amount of mystery surrounded Khena himself. As a toddler he had been found in the remains of an earthquake in Peru. He was then adopted by Georges Caillau, a European scholar, archaeologist and ethnologist. Some ten years later, Khena met the Scrameustache and proved himself resistant to the alien's (non-lethal) weapons and other technology. This resistance made the Scrameustache curious and he stuck around hoping that time would provide an explanation.

Title and Names
Khena's name was later dropped from the title of the series which is now just called Le Scrameustache. He does however remain a leading character, some of the stories looking at his development from a boy in his early teens to an actual teenager.

The name "Khena" is taken from the word Quena which is an Inca flute.

The name Scrameustache does not appear to be based on any puns or wordplays. Gos claims that he simply came up with strange names as part of a game with friends. The same could be said about the Smurfs, or Schtroumpfs, created by Peyo, and which Gos worked on for a while. However, in D'où viens-tu, Scrameustache, p. 12, it seems that Scrameustache is a backronym for Sujet Créé par Radiations Artificielles et Manipulations Extra-Utérines Sans Toucher Aux Chromosomes Héréditaires Endogènes (Subject created by artificial radiations and extra-uterine manipulations without touching to hereditary endogenic chromosomes).

Khena's adoptive father is Uncle Georges Caillau. "Caillau" sounds like "caillou" which is the French for "stone". In Le dilemme de Khéna (Khena's Dilemma), the young man indicates that George is descended from an aristocratic family called de la Roche (Roche being the French for "rock")

The World of the Scrameustache
Over the years, Gos has expanded the Scrameustache's universe, with him and Khena travelling to other planets and mixing with other aliens, above all the Galaxians.

Using his saucer, he and Khena divide their time between Earth, planet Aktarka and its two neighbouring moons. Aktarka has at least two continents and a variety of archipelagos in its oceans. Due to the orbit of its moons, both can be seen from one continent, while the other continent only sees one; the continent with view on both moons is referred to as the Continent of the Two Moons. While referred to the other continent is so far not been visited in the series.
 
Aktarka does not have cities like Earth, instead its human populations lives in towns and villages where each person has a bit of land to cultivate food.
Aktarka is mostly tropical, with temperate zones existing near its poles.

It is hinted in later albums that the citizens of Aktarka are descendants of Atlantians who managed to flee before the destruction of their continent on Earth.
In the series the destruction is the result of falling debris of Earth smaller moon, when the Atlantians had changed its orbit as a technological boast towards the inhabitants of the continent Mü, they inadvertently placed it in the path of a comet which smashed the moon.

Uncle Georges lives on Earth; some human friends live on Aktarka; the friendly Galaxians live on one of the moons (the smaller of the two); and the warlike Kromoks live on the other.

Characters

The Scrameustache
The Scrameustache is a genetically-created hybrid alien who resembles an upright cat. His feet are furry and hand-like and he can use them to grasp hold of handrails and other similar supports, in a way similar to a monkey. He was created by Najboul, a human scientist of planet Aktarka, who used elements of his planet's various species.

Aktarka's biggest mainland is known as the Continent of the Two Moons, and that is where the Scrameustache was trained as an astronaut. He later went to Earth on an undefined mission. It is hinted that the Aktarkian leaders feared his superior intelligence would turn against them and thus sent him into some kind of unofficial exile.

He now lives on Earth with Khena and Uncle Georges Caillau and is known to some of the locals.

The Scrameustache is a highly intelligent and charming character, always willing to go out of his way to help his friends. But he can also be cheeky and mischievous at times, especially towards Uncle Georges.

Clothing and Equipment
The Scrameustache wears a blue jumpsuit and an anti-gravity belt which slows down his falls. He does not wear shoes, except in winter time.

His main article is a bright red helmet with a brainwave-activated lamp that can be used to illuminate at will. It can also shoot a laser which paralyses people, turning then into pillars of salt for a short time. This is quite harmless unless they happen to be near water, in which case parts of their bodies may shrink as a result.

The aerials on the helmet can be used for communicating or listening into radio-emitted conversations, but this requires a certain amount of concentration on the part of the wearer.

His flying saucer is for intergalactic exploration and, by applying theories and calculations based on faster-than-light travel, can go back in time. He also has a two-seater wheel-less car-like vehicle called the Passe-partout which can fly within a breathable atmosphere.

Tobor is a robot owned by the Scrameustache. His "mouth" has the same functions as the Scrameustache's helmet "lamp": i.e. he can turn people temporarily into salt. He is also capable of flight.

Khena
Khena was found as a toddler in the remains of an earthquake in Peru. He was adopted by Georges Caillau. He first met the Scrameustache when he was in his early teens.

A later adventure established that Khena was himself an alien who came from Aktarka, the same planet as his cat-like friend ! (There are hints in the earlier storyline that Gos intended this from the start.)

Khena and the Scrameustache now spend much of their time travelling to Aktarka and other planets to visit friends and relatives. But their main home is still on Earth where they loyally stick by Uncle Georges.

Uncle Georges
Uncle Georges Caillau is a European scholar, archaeologist and ethnologist. He adopted Khena while on an archaeological dig in Peru. He refrains from space travelling if he can avoid it and finds journeys back in time a bit nerve-racking. Although a very decent man he is quick-tempered at times, and especially finds his son's alien friends a bit of a handful. (On one occasion the Scrameustache unintentionally produced a clone of himself: "As if one wasn't enough !" groaned Uncle Georges.)

The Galaxians
The Galaxians are friendly, little green people who live on one of the moons that orbit planet Aktarka. Khena and the Scrameustache frequently visit them.

Galaxian society is very democratic, even in the sharing of tasks: for example, while away on missions, the crew members of a space ship take it in turn to be the ship's captain, or Chief-of-the-Day. The annual head of state is called the Prince-of-the-Year and is the Galaxian who received the most merit points over the past year.

In overall charge is the Council of Elders which is made up of five older long-bearded Galaxians. However, they are not as wise as they would like to make out and one or two of them are quite senile; in fact a lot of their time is spent arguing between each other. The younger Galaxians are quite aware of their deficiencies and often enjoy a good laugh at the Elder's expense (in one story a young Galaxian lawyer did warn the Elders in their faces that he could cause them to "lose what little credit for wisdom you have left".)

(From the early-1980s to the late-1990s, many one-page gags and short stories were published in Spirou magazine under the title Les Galaxiens, giving humorous descriptions of Galaxian society. Some of the longer stories, such as Le prince des Galaxiens (The Galaxian Prince) or L'oeuf astral (The Astral Egg) could be described as actual Galaxian adventures with Khena and the Scrameustache appearing simply because they were the stars of the series.)

The Galaxians are not native to the moon they inhabit, in the album [The Children of the Rainbow]. Khena, Scrameustache and friends are stuck on an island where a strange meteorite blocks their technology. They discover a 'temple' with the story of the first colony ship of the Galaxians, having crash landed on the island due to the same reasons our friends are stuck. The Galaxians left their world cause it was heating up without them knowing why. They later discover a ship sent by the descendants of those who stayed is also stuck on the island. Eventually the meteorite disrupting all the technology is found and neutralized. The colony ship is also found and its passengers awakened set to integrate into the new Galaxian society.

Khena's other family
Khena's actual parents are Torcal, an eminent scientist from planet Aktarka, and his wife. They were sent to Earth on a mission to Peru and took their baby son Gari with them. However, an enemy had sabotaged their spaceship and, while testing it, they were sent to an unknown period of time and space leaving Gari behind. He was found by local Peruvian Indians and named Khena. Adjusting to life in another period of Earth's past (the European 16th Century), Torcal and his wife had two more children, son Thibaut and a daughter Berengere. They were eventually found and returned to Aktarka. Khena knew that the local laws restricted families to two children each and used this in order to stay on Earth with Uncle Georges. During the school holidays he uses the Scrameustache's saucer to visit them on Aktarka.

Other Aktarkians include Torcal's brother Yamouth and his daughter Pilili.

The Ramouchas
Ramouchas  are bear-like creatures from planet Aktarka. They live on an island separated from the main continent. One of them played an important role in the Scrameustache's upbringing. They are intelligent beings, though they are not capable of speaking. They are friendly and fun-loving but give off electric shocks as a form of humour.

Falzar, the Wizard of the Great Bear (Ursa Major)
Falzar, the Wizard of the Great Bear (Ursa Major), is the nearest the Scrameustache has to a sworn enemy. He is a powerful and power-crazed wizard. At one stage he was turned into a menhir by undetermined aliens and placed on Earth amongst the Carnac stones in Brittany, France. Falzar occasionally manages to break free of his imprisonment and gets up to all sorts of devilish plots, such as turning people into animals. In the end though, he usually ends up as a menhir again and is returned to the alignments. The word "Falzar" is French slang for trousers.

The Kromoks and the Stixes
Another set of enemies are the Kromoks and the Stixes. Planet Aktarka has two moons: the friendly Galaxians live on one of the moons; and the warlike Kromoks on the other.
While the Stixes often visit Aktarka and its moons, there are no indications that they are native to either.
The ape-like Kromoks aim to conquer Aktarka but being naturally stupid does not make it easy. The Stixes, yellow-skinned with pointed heads, are, on the other hand, ingenious and conniving characters and it is they who come up with the plans that the Scrameustache and his friends have to face.

Story Summaries
The Scrameustache's adventures have not been published in English. Below is a list of the French titles, their year of publication, an English translation of the titles and a brief description. They are listed in order of publication. All the stories have been written and drawn by Gos. Since 1985, his son Walt has assisted in the drawing.

Between 1972 and 2019, 44 books of the Scrameustache's adventures have been published.

References

External links

Official website

Belgian comic strips
Belgian comics characters
Belgian comics titles
Dupuis titles
Science fiction comics
Fictional cats
Extraterrestrial characters in comics
1972 comics debuts
Comics characters introduced in 1972
Comics set in the 1970s
Comics set in the 1980s
Comics set in the 1990s
Comics set in the 2000s
Comics set in the 2010s
Comics about cats
Male characters in comics
Comics set in Belgium